Big City Orchestra is a long-running art/anti-art group based generally in California. They have an ever rotating cast of musician and nonmusician members. They were formed in 1979 as the house band for a network of artist residences in the South Bay area of Los Angeles.

Releases
Almost comedically prolific, BCO sailed through the cassette culture movement of the 1980s and 1990s with about 130 hour-long releases on over 100 labels. 

Other work has included four video collections, five 7″ singles, one 8″ single, one 10″ single,  10+ compact discs, well over 40 CD-Rs, and more than 300 compilation appearances.

A partial list of releases 

 Baobab (Cass)  Biotope Art Organization
 Bretagne (Cass, C60)	 Nihilistic Recordings
 Fresh Prezzies - Exclusive Tracks for Radio and Friends (CDr)	ubuibi
 Gaiement (Cass) Le Réseau
 Mind Bent and Fancy Free (Cass) - Industrial Therapy Unit
 My Life in the Bush of Kate (Cass) - UBUIBI Ralph
 Pandora Flutter Tongue (Cass) - Ecto Tapes
 Planet of Giants (Cass) - Peuleschille Tapes
 Progressive Composition (Cass) - ZNS Tapes
 Rites of Wrong (Cass) - UBUIBI
 Seeds of Doom (Cass) - BloedvlagProdukt
 Sound Choice Cassette Culture Selection (Cass) Sound Choice
 Telegraphe (Cass) - New Flesh Tapes
 Untitled (Cass) - Kadef
 Verstimmt (Cass) - Ecto Tapes
 We Like Noize Too (Cass) - UBUIBI
 Massacre of The Innocents (Cass, C90) - Sound Of Pig 1985
 Bob Hope's Fruit Loop Special (Cass, C60) - Audiofile Tapes 1986
 Edge of Destruction (Cass) - Swinging Axe Productions 1986
 Gateway of Fruit Loops (Cass) - The Subelectrick Institute 1986
 Massacre Again (Cass) - Tonspur Tapes 1986
 Parade of Idiots (Cass) - Bog-Art 1986
 Arc of Infinity (Cass) - Harsh Reality Music 1987
 Fury from the Deep (Cass) - Markus Schwill 1987
 Hand of Fear (Cass) - Calypso Now 1987
 Mile After Mile (Cass, C60) - Sound Of Pig 1987
 Mind of Evil (Cass) - The Subelectrick Institute 1987
 Myth Makers (Cass) - Nihilistic Recordings 1987
 Trail of Destruction (Cass, C60) - S.J. Organisation 1987
 A Good Time to Start Something New (Cass) - Epitapes 	1988
 Absence Sharpens, Presents Strengthens (Cass) - GGE Records 1988
 Animal Religion (Cass) - Ralph Records 1988
 Everyman Is a Volume (Cass, C60) - Korm Plastics 1988
 In the Near Future (Cass) - Freedom In A Vacuum 1988
 Long Term Stimulation (Cass, Ltd) - SSS Productions 1988
 Magnetic Personality (Cass) - IEP 1988
 Web of Fear (Cass, C60) - S.J. Organisation 1988
 Aime-Morot (Cass) - Harsh Reality Music 1989
 Annual 1988 (Cass) - UBUIBI 1989
 Childhood Remembrances (Cass) - Seiten Sprung Aufnahmen 1989
 Headache Remedy (Cass) - Ecto Tapes 1989
 Obivion Realized (Cass) - Minus Habens Records 1989
 Painfull Audio Enema (Cass) - Lowlife Audio 1989
 The Man of Steal (Cass, C60) - Audiofile Tapes 1989
 Bell, Book and Candle (Cass) - Tears Compilations 1990
 Prattling Box (Cass) - Tragic Figures 1990
 Resurrection Men (Cass) - Seiten Sprung Aufnahmen 1990
 Sounders ; A Herd Of (Cass) - Industrial Therapy Unit	1990
 Tallywags (Cass) - Exo Product 1990
 Annual 1990 (Cass) - UBUIBI 1991
 The Four Cassettes of the Apocalypse (CD) - Subelectrick Institute 1991
 Beatlerape (CD) - Realization Recordings 1993
 Greatest Hits and Test Tones (CD) - Pogus Productions 1993
 Schall & Rauch (Cass) - Tonspur Tapes 1993
 So Much Dancing Then Nothing (Cass) - Old Europa Cafe 1993
 A Child's Garden of Noise (7", Ltd) - Drone Records 1994
 So Much Nearer Than Ubiquitous (Cass) - UBUIBI 1994
 Tryst 7 (Cass) - UBUIBI 1994 With the Legendary Pink Dots
 Grass b/w Grass (7") - Sick Muse Records 1995
 The Consumer (CD) - Commercial Failure 1995
 Tryst 8 (2xCass, Ltd) - UBUIBI 1995
 Anguilliform (Cass, Ltd, C60) - EE Tapes 1996
 Instructions for Use (CD) - Pure (US) 1996
 Aime-Morot (Cass) - HalTapes 1997
 And When We Get Homme, We Find Someone Else's Male (Cass)- FDR Tapes  1997
 And When We Wake Up, There Is Sheep in Our Eyes (Cass) - Doomsday Transmissions 1997
 Arc of Infinity (Cass) - HalTapes 1997
 Eek! (Cass, C60) - EE Tapes 1997
 Split Single (7") - Aquese Recordings 1997
 Untitled (Cass, Single, Ltd) - Doomsday Transmissions 1997
 When We Wake Up... (CDr) - HalTapes 1997
 Virus Radio Vol. I (Cass) - Mutant Cactus Recordings 1998
 Don't Let Him Touch You (Cass, Album, C60) - BLACK ORCHID Productions 1999
 Everyman Is a Volume (CDr) - Korm Plastics 1999
 Arc of Infinity (CDr) - Harsh Reality Music 2000
 Block Cedar Oakandstraw: Would (CDr) - Blade Records 2001
 Eurotour 2001 (CDr) - UBUIBI 2001
 New Beat for Baby (CD, Album) - Negative Foundation 2002
 Scarab (CDr) - EE Tapes 2002
 Can't We Just Have Sex Instead? (File, MP3) - Brokenwave 2003
 In a Persian Market (CDr) - Verato Project 2003
 Moisture (CDr) - Reduktive Musiken 2003
 Trixxy Pixxy (File, MP3) - Comfort Stand Recordings 2004
 Airre (CDr) - Entr'acte 2005
 Big City Orchestra (File, MP3) - Beta:Sound 2005
 Boom Crash Crash (File, MP3) - Comfort Stand Recordings 2005
 Kismet (File, MP3) - Umbrella Noize Collective 2005
 Progressive Composition (File, MP3) - ZNS Tapes 2005
 Things Fall Down (File, MP3) - Lostfrog 2005
 Azimuth (File, MP3) - Umbrella Noize Collective 2006
 Dada Is Dead, Long Live Dada (CDr, Album) - UBUIBI 2006
 Does Art For... (CDr) - Roil Noise Offensive 2006
 DoUBle the TroUBle (File, MP3) - Umbrella Noize Collective 2006
 Love Film Greats (CDr) - Roil Noise Offensive 2006
 Red Dog 9 (CDr, Album, Ltd) - UBUIBI 2006
 Signals and Code (File, MP3) - Umbrella Noize Collective 2006
 Drone Gnomes (10", Ltd, Mar) - Substantia Innominata 	2007

Musical groups from Los Angeles
Musical groups established in 1979
Cassette culture 1970s–1990s